Preston Brown may refer to:

 Preston Brown (United States Army officer) (1872–1948), American general
 Preston Brown (wide receiver) (born 1958), American football player
 Preston Brown (linebacker) (born 1992), American football player